Santa Barbara County, officially the County of Santa Barbara, is located in Southern California. As of the 2020 census, the population was 448,229. The county seat is Santa Barbara, and the largest city is Santa Maria.

Santa Barbara County comprises the Santa Maria-Santa Barbara, CA Metropolitan Statistical Area. Most of the county is part of the California Central Coast. Mainstays of the county's economy include engineering, resource extraction (particularly petroleum extraction and diatomaceous earth mining), winemaking, agriculture, and education. The software development and tourism industries are important employers in the southern part of the county.

Southern Santa Barbara County is sometimes considered the northern cultural boundary of Southern California.

History
The Santa Barbara County area, including the Northern Channel Islands, was first settled by Native Americans at least 13,000 years ago. Evidence for a Paleoindian presence has been found in the form of a fluted Clovis-like point found in the 1980s along the western Santa Barbara Coast, as well as the remains of Arlington Springs Man found on Santa Rosa Island in the 1960s. For thousands of years, the area was home to the Chumash tribe of Native Americans, complex hunter-gatherers who lived along the coast and in interior valleys leaving rock art in many locations, including Painted Cave.

Europeans first contacted the Chumash in AD 1542, when three Spanish ships under the command of Juan Rodríguez Cabrillo explored the area. The Santa Barbara Channel received its name from Spanish explorer Sebastián Vizcaíno when he sailed along the California coast in 1602; his ships entered the channel on December 4, the day of the feast of Santa Barbara. Spanish ships associated with the Manila Galleon trade probably made emergency stops along the coast during the next 167 years, but no permanent settlements were established.

The first land expedition to explore California, led by Gaspar de Portolà explored the coastal area in 1769, on its way to Monterey Bay. The party traveled the same route on the return to San Diego in January 1770. That same year, a second expedition to Monterey again passed through the area. The DeAnza expeditions of 1774-76 followed Portola's trail.

The Presidio of Santa Barbara was established in 1782 (4th of 5 in California), followed by Mission Santa Barbara in 1786 – both in what is now the city of Santa Barbara. The presidio and mission kept Vizcaino's denomination, as did the later city and county – a common practice which has preserved the names of many of the 21 California Missions. Other missions in Santa Barbara County are located in Santa Ynez and Lompoc.

European contacts had devastating effects on the Chumash people, including a series of disease epidemics that drastically reduced Chumash population. The Chumash survived, however, and thousands of Chumash descendants still live in the Santa Barbara area or surrounding counties. A tribal homeland was established in 1901, the Santa Ynez Reservation.

Following the Mexican secularization of the missions in the 1830s, the mission pasture lands were mostly broken up into large ranchos and granted mainly to prominent local citizens who already lived in the area. 604 of these land grants were later confirmed by the state of California, with 36 in Santa Barbara County.

Santa Barbara County was one of the 27 original counties of California, formed in 1850 at the time of statehood. The county's territory was later divided to create Ventura County in 1873.

Geography

Four of the Channel Islands – San Miguel Island, Santa Cruz Island, Santa Rosa Island and Santa Barbara Island – are in Santa Barbara County. They form the largest part of the Channel Islands National Park (which also includes Anacapa Island in Ventura County).

Santa Barbara County has a mountainous interior abutting several coastal plains on the west and south coasts of the county. The largest concentration of population is on the southern coastal plain, referred to as the "south coast" – meaning the part of the county south of the Santa Ynez Mountains. This region includes the cities of Santa Barbara, Goleta, and Carpinteria, as well as the unincorporated areas of Hope Ranch, Summerland, Mission Canyon, Montecito, and Isla Vista, along with stretches of unincorporated area such as Noleta. North of the Santa Ynez range in the Santa Ynez Valley are the towns of Solvang, Buellton, and Lompoc; the unincorporated towns of Santa Ynez, Los Olivos and Ballard; the unincorporated areas of Mission Hills and Vandenberg Village; and Vandenberg Space Force Base, where the Santa Ynez River flows out to the sea. North of the Santa Ynez Valley are the cities of Santa Maria and Guadalupe, and the unincorporated towns of Orcutt, Los Alamos, Casmalia, Garey, and Sisquoc. In the extreme northeastern portion of the county are the small cities of New Cuyama, Cuyama, and Ventucopa. As of January 1, 2006, Santa Maria has become the largest city in Santa Barbara County.

The principal mountain ranges of the county are the Santa Ynez Mountains in the south, and the San Rafael Mountains and Sierra Madre Mountains in the interior and northeast. Most of the mountainous area is within the Los Padres National Forest, and includes two wilderness areas: the San Rafael Wilderness and the Dick Smith Wilderness. The highest elevation in the county is 6820 feet (2079 m) at Big Pine Mountain in the San Rafaels.

North of the mountains is the arid and sparsely populated Cuyama Valley, portions of which are in San Luis Obispo and Ventura Counties. Oil production, ranching, and agriculture dominate the land use in the privately owned parts of the Cuyama Valley; the Los Padres National Forest is adjacent to the south, and regions to the north and northeast are owned by the Bureau of Land Management and the Nature Conservancy.

Channel Islands

The four Channel Islands in Santa Barbara County are Santa Barbara Island, San Miguel Island, Santa Rosa Island, and the large Santa Cruz Island. All of them contain native and endemic wildlife, like the island oak and Torrey Pine. All four have the deer mouse living on them, the three latter, the island fox, and the two latter, the island spotted skunk. There used to be skunks on San Miguel Island, but due to predation from marine life, birds, and foxes, the San Miguel Island skunk has gone extinct.

Climate
Santa Barbara County has a mild warm-summer Mediterranean climate. Along the coast, temperatures rarely exceeds  in the summer, but rarely dip below freezing in winter. Above , temperatures can frequently fall below freezing during the winter months. The area experiences nearly all of its rainfall during the winter months, and rarely sees any rain at all during the summer months.

The area's dry, warm summers often lead to high wildfire danger in the fall. An example of this is the massive Thomas Fire, which started in Ventura County and rapidly spread into southern Santa Barbara County in December 2017. At the time, the fire was the largest wildfire ever to burn in California in terms of geographical size, but was topped only eight months later in the Mendocino Complex Fire in northern California. Heavy rainfall occurred the following January, causing massive mudslides and debris flows from the steep, fire-denuded hillsides. The community of Montecito was especially hard-hit. As of February 3, 2018, 21 are known dead and 2 are still missing.

Air quality

Air quality in the county, unlike much of southern California, is generally good because of the prevailing winds off of the Pacific Ocean. The county is in attainment of federal standards for ozone and particulate matter. In July 2020 the county was designated as attainment for the state ozone standard, but it still does not attain the state PM10 standard.

Adjacent counties
San Luis Obispo County (North).
Kern County (Northeast).
Ventura County (Southeast).

National protected areas

 Channel Islands National Park (part)
 Guadalupe-Nipomo Dunes National Wildlife Refuge (part)
 Los Padres National Forest (part)
 Burton Mesa Ecological Reserve

Demographics

2020 census

Note: the US Census treats Hispanic/Latino as an ethnic category. This table excludes Latinos from the racial categories and assigns them to a separate category. Hispanics/Latinos can be of any race.

2011

Places by population, race, and income

2010
The 2010 United States Census reported that Santa Barbara County had a population of 423,895. The ethnic makeup of Santa Barbara County was 295,124 (69.6%) White, 8,513 (2.0%) African American, 5,485 (1.3%) Native American, 20,665 (4.9%) Asian (1.6% Filipino, 1.0% Chinese, 0.5% Japanese, 0.5% Korean, 0.3% Vietnamese, 0.4% Indian), 806 (0.2%) Pacific Islander, 73,860 (17.4%) from other races, and 19,442 (4.6%) from two or more races. Hispanic or Latino of any race were 181,687 persons (42.9%); 38.5% of Santa Barbara County is Mexican, 0.4% Salvadoran, 0.4% Guatemalan, and 0.3% Puerto Rican.

2000
As of the census of 2000, there were 399,347 people, 136,622 households, and 89,487 families residing in the county. The population density was 146 people per square mile (56/km2). There were 142,901 housing units at an average density of 52 per square mile (20/km2). The ethnic makeup of the county was 72.7% White, 2.3% Black or African American, 1.2% Native American, 4.1% Asian, 0.2% Pacific Islander, 15.2% from other races, and 4.3% from two or more races. 34.2% of the population were Hispanic or Latino of any race. 9.1% were of German, 8.5% English and 6.5% Irish ancestry according to Census 2000. 26.6% of the population reported speaking Spanish at home.

There were 136,622 households, out of which 32.4% had children under the age of 18 living with them, 51.4% were married couples living together, 10.0% had a female householder with no husband present, and 34.5% were non-families. 24.3% of all households were made up of individuals, and 9.4% had someone living alone who was 65 years of age or older. The average household size was 2.8 and the average family size was 3.33.

In the county, the population was spread out, with 24.9% under the age of 18, 13.3% from 18 to 24, 29.0% from 25 to 44, 20.1% from 45 to 64, and 12.7% who were 65 years of age or older. The median age was 33 years. For every 100 females there were 100.1 males. For every 100 females age 18 and over, there were 98.1 males.

The median income for a household in the county was $46,677, and the median income for a family was $54,042. Males had a median income of $37,997 versus $29,593 for females. The per capita income for the county was $23,059. About 8.5% of families and 14.3% of the population were below the poverty line, including 16.3% of those under age 18 and 6.2% of those age 65 or over.

The population of the area south of the Santa Ynez Mountain crest—the portion known as "South County"—was 201,161 according to the 2000 census; thus the population is almost exactly split between north and south. Recent years have shown slow or even negative growth for regions in the south county, while areas in the north county have continued to grow at a faster rate.

Government
The County is governed by a five-member Board of Supervisors. The Board's three-vote majority has shifted over the years between the north and south. The Board now includes two members from South County, two members from North County, and one member from Mid-County.

The Board of Supervisors appoints a County Executive Officer, who serves at the pleasure of the Board, to operate the County governmental organization. The County government includes 4296 employees and a budget of $757 million. The County provides various services ranging from health services to law enforcement.

Federal and state representation
All of Santa Barbara County is located within . Prior to the 2012 redistricting in California, the county was divided into two congressional districts, which reflected the north and south divide – the hallmark of the county's politics. Lois Capps represented the coastal areas, while Elton Gallegly, a Republican, represented the northern part of the county.

Policing

The Santa Barbara County Sheriff provides court protection, jail management, and coroner service for the entire county. It provides patrol and detective services for the unincorporated areas of the county and two cities by contract. Incorporated municipalities within the county that have their own municipal police departments are Santa Maria, Lompoc, and Santa Barbara City. Carpinteria and Goleta by contract with the Sheriff.

The Santa Barbara County Probation Department provides services for those placed on probation or detained in Santa Maria Juvenile Hall or Los Prietos Boys Camp. Tanja Heitman is the current Chief Probation Officer. The department was established in 1909 following the enactment of California's first probation laws.  After 106 years in service, there are currently 241 probation officers and juvenile institutions officers keeping tabs on 6,600 adults and 1,350 juveniles as of 2015. The probation department has locations in Santa Maria, Santa Barbara, and Lompoc.

Politics
For most of the 20th century, Santa Barbara County was a Republican stronghold. From 1920 to 1988, it was only carried by two Democrats: Franklin D. Roosevelt and Lyndon B. Johnson. However, the county has leaned to the left in recent years. Overall, Santa Barbara is a Democratic-leaning county in Presidential and congressional elections. The last Republican to win a majority in the county was George H. W. Bush in 1988. However, there is a dramatic difference in gradient between the "conservative" northern areas and the "liberal" southern areas of the county.

Santa Barbara County has long been divided between competing political interests. North of the Santa Ynez Mountains, agricultural activities and oil development have long provided jobs. The northern portion also contains a large military base, Vandenberg Space Force Base, and thus military interests are prominent. These influences have created a Republican-leaning northern half.

On the other hand, the southern portion of Santa Barbara county has had an economy based on tourism, with a significant percentage of people with white-collar jobs, formerly in aerospace but more recently in software and other high-tech pursuits. Additionally, the University of California, Santa Barbara contributes to a liberal populace. The southern portion of the county has a strong history of left-wing activism, with anti-war protests common in Santa Barbara. It is generally believed that the inspiration for Earth Day was the 1969 Santa Barbara oil spill; however, Gaylord Nelson, the senator who proposed the idea, has never directly cited any direct cause for the establishment of the holiday.

On November 4, 2008, Santa Barbara County voted 53.5% against Proposition 8 which amended the California Constitution to ban same-sex marriages. It was the only county in Southern California to vote against it.

Proposed county splits

In 1978, some residents of the northern area initiated an effort to create a "Los Padres County" out of the northern area of the county; in a referendum, this effort was defeated by a 3-1 margin.

In 2006, northern county organizations initiated a similar secession proposal, to create a proposed "Mission County." Then-Governor Arnold Schwarzenegger appointed a formation commission to research the viability of the proposed northern county, which reached the conclusion, stated in its final report released on March 28, 2005, that "the proposed County, upon formation in 2006, would not be economically viable at current levels of service." The proposed new Mission County would have included the cities of Santa Maria, Lompoc, Guadalupe, Buellton, and Solvang, as well as the Cuyama Valley and Santa Ynez Valley, including Lake Cachuma. Most of the south coast of Santa Barbara County, along with the Channel Islands, would have remained with that county, with the exception of the stretch from Hollister Ranch to Point Conception. Most of the Los Padres National Forest also would have remained with Santa Barbara County. But in June 2006, voters rejected the formation of the new county, with more than 80% voting no.

Voter registration
46.8% of Santa Barbara County voters state their political party preference is Democratic, compared to 24.9% who prefer Republicans, and 21.6% who have No Party Preference. As of 2021, each of the 8 cities have more Democrats than any other political party.

Notes

Law enforcement & crime 

The Santa Barbara County Sheriff's Office provides law enforcement for the unincorporated areas of the county, as well as several cities within the county. The cities that the Sheriff's Office provides police services for include Buellton, Carpinteria, Goleta and Solvang.

Founded in 1850, the Santa Barbara Sheriff's Office is the oldest law enforcement agency in the state. In its early days, the department battled outlaws Salomon Pico and Jack Powers. Initially having a single Sheriff, aided only by a jailer and guard in charge of the chain gang, the department now has over 600 full-time employees.

The following table includes the number of incidents reported and the rate per 1,000 persons for each type of offense.

Economy
Oil production began in 1886 with drilling in Summerland. Enormous oil fields such as the Orcutt, Lompoc, Santa Maria Valley, and Cat Canyon fields provided jobs and a steady supply of oil, gas, and asphalt since the first oil discovery in the Solomon Hills in 1901. Protests have marked periodic resistance to the impact of oil drilling over the years. A protest in 1929 in Santa Barbara expressed the frustration of the wealthy who came here to get away from it all. The largest spill in California waters, credited as a spark for the modern environmental movement, coated the beaches and Santa Barbara Harbor with a thick crude in 1969. In recent years, major oil companies have left the area, turning over their oil leases to small independents, and decommissioning some leases areas that were no longer profitable. Concerns about the economy were foremost when, in 2014, Measure P was placed on the county ballot. If approve by the voters the measure would ban "high-intensity petroleum operations" in the county.

The city of Santa Barbara and other coastal communities support a significant tourism economy. White-collar jobs, previously with an emphasis in aerospace but more recently in software and other high-tech pursuits are encouraged by proximity to the University of California, Santa Barbara. Vandenberg Space Force Base has traditionally had a large economic impact in the northern portion of the county and continues to be the site of frequent satellite launches.

Agriculture
Agriculture is the top major producing industry as of 2016. Strawberries are the county's top crop, with $413 million in production making up more than a third of all county agricultural production. Wine grapes are number two.

County farmers began growing hemp after it was removed from a list of controlled substances along with other provisions of the Hemp Farming Act of 2018. These provisions were included in the 2018 Farm Bill which made hemp legal for agricultural uses. Cannabis and hemp plants have a similar look and smell making it hard to tell the difference.

Wine country
The first wine grapes in Santa Barbara County were planted by the missionaries associated with Mission Santa Barbara late in the 18th century. Since commercial viticulture rebounded in the 1960s, Santa Barbara County has become a prominent viticultural region. The 2004 Alexander Payne film, Sideways, set in the Santa Ynez Valley, brought additional attention to the county as a wine region, especially for its Pinot noir wines.

The region, also noted for its Chardonnay wines, is gaining a reputation for Rhone varietals including Syrah and Viognier. Santa Barbara wine grapes now command among the highest prices anywhere in the state.

The areas planted with wine grapes are mixed in with the rolling hills, ancient oak trees, oil fields, cattle ranches, and natural areas in the central part of the county. The county now claims more than 115 wineries cultivating  with the vast majority of the vineyards in the county's Central Coast American Viticultural Areas: Santa Maria Valley AVA, Santa Ynez Valley AVA, Sta. Rita Hills AVA, Happy Canyon AVA, Los Olivos District AVA and Ballard Canyon AVA each with its own distinct terroir. The county continues to gain AVA recognition with Alisos Canyon AVA being the recent established AVA in 2020.

The Foxen Canyon Wine Trail is situated about an hour north of Santa Barbara, and several miles from Los Olivos. Numerous events are held year-round in this area by the Foxen Canyon Wine Trail Association.

The trail is home to many wineries including Andrew Murray Vineyards, Fess Parker Winery and Firestone Vineyard. One of the wineries along the trail, Cambria Estate Winery, was featured in the 3rd episode of The Bachelor, an American reality television series, Season 15, on January 17, 2011.

Pinot Noir and Chardonnay are common all long the trail while the southern part also has many Rhone style wines due to the warmer climate. In the North, Burgundy styles tend to predominate more due to the cooler maritime weather.

Cannabis

The county limited retail sales to eight establishments that will be distributed so they don't become clustered in any of the unincorporated communities. In the first four months of the legalization of growing cannabis for recreational purposes in California, the county issued almost 800 permits for cultivators, the most of any county in the state. Under the legalization of recreational cannabis in California, companies must be licensed by the local agency and the state to grow, test, or sell cannabis and the county may authorize none or only some of these activities. Local governments may not prohibit adults, who are in compliance with state laws, from growing, using, or transporting marijuana for personal use.

The Carpinteria Valley has become the densest concentration of cannabis farms in the United States. Farmers will combine small permits for neighboring plots of land though as licenses for over 1 acre of land are not allowed until 2023. The owners of many greenhouses in the Carpinteria Valley, that were built as nurseries for flowers and other plants, have converted them to growing cannabis.

While the grow operations are outside the city limits of Carpinteria, city residents have complained about the smell of odor-intense terpenes given off by cannabis plants. The county  contracts with a private industrial hygienist to ensure odor pollution is not occurring. The Sheriff's Department has a Cannabis Compliance Team that conducts background checks on cannabis growers and their employees and carries out raids on illegal operations.

A report in 2022 to the Board of Supervisors had 79 cannabis operations operating in the county.

Education
There are 20 independent school districts in Santa Barbara County, and the Santa Barbara County Education Office serves as an intermediate agency between those districts and the California Department of Education. During the 2013 school year, 67,701 students were enrolled in Santa Barbara County schools, kindergarten through grade 12.

There are also a number of private schools in the county. The Los Angeles Archdiocese operates two Catholic high schools and several elementary schools.

Culture
In addition to 41 listings of National Register of Historic Place and 16 California Historical Landmarks, the county lists 50 County of Santa Barbara Landmarks.

Transportation

Major highways

 U.S. Route 101
 State Route 1
 State Route 33
 State Route 135
 State Route 144
 State Route 154
 State Route 166
 State Route 192
 State Route 217
 State Route 246

Public transportation
Santa Barbara County is served by Amtrak trains and Greyhound buses.
The southern portion of the county is served by the Santa Barbara Metropolitan Transit District.
In the North County, the cities of Lompoc, Santa Maria, and Buellton/Solvang have their own bus services.

Airports
Santa Barbara Municipal Airport, is located near Goleta, west of Santa Barbara.
Santa Maria Public Airport is located just southwest of Downtown Santa Maria.
Lompoc Airport is located on the north side of Lompoc.
Santa Ynez Airport is just southeast of Santa Ynez.
Commercial flights are available at Santa Barbara Airport and Santa Maria Public Airport.

Communities

Cities

Buellton
Carpinteria
Goleta
Guadalupe
Lompoc
Santa Barbara (county seat)
Santa Maria  (largest city)
Solvang

Census-designated places

Ballard
Casmalia
Cuyama
Eastern Goleta Valley
Garey
Isla Vista
Los Alamos
Los Olivos
Mission Canyon
Mission Hills
Montecito
New Cuyama
Orcutt
Santa Ynez
Sisquoc
Summerland
Toro Canyon
UC Santa Barbara
Vandenberg Space Force Base
Vandenberg Village

Unincorporated communities
Gaviota
Hope Ranch
Painted Cave
Surf
Ventucopa

Population ranking

The population ranking of the following table is based on the 2020 census of Santa Barbara County.

† county seat

See also 
List of museums in the California Central Coast
National Register of Historic Places listings in Santa Barbara County, California
List of school districts in San Luis Obispo County, California
List of school districts in Santa Barbara County, California
List of schools in the Roman Catholic Archdiocese of Los Angeles
Santa Barbara County Courthouse
Santa Barbara County Fire Department
Santa Barbara County Probation Department

Notes

References

Further reading

 Charles Montville Gidney, Benjamin Brooks, and Edwin M. Sheridan, History of Santa Barbara, San Luis Obispo and Ventura Counties, California. In Two Volumes. Chicago: Lewis Publishing Co., 1917. Volume 1 | Volume 2
 Yda Addis Storke, A Memorial and Biographical History of the Counties of Santa Barbara, San Luis Obispo and Ventura, California... Chicago: Lewis Publishing Co., 1891.

External links

Official Santa Barbara County Property Tax Payment website
California Department of Fish and Wildlife – Burton Mesa Ecological Reserve website
County quick facts
Official Santa Barbara CITY website
Santa Barbara County Education Office

 
California counties
Counties in Southern California
1850 establishments in California
Populated places established in 1850
Majority-minority counties in California